Aleiphaquilon rugosum is a species of beetle in the family Cerambycidae. It was described by Martins and Galileo in 1994.

References

Neocorini
Beetles described in 1994